The 2005 World Series of Poker opened play on June 2nd, continuing through the Main Event No Limit World Championship starting on July 7th. The conclusion of the Main Event on July 15th marked the close of play, and the largest prize in sports and/or television history at the time ($7,500,000) was awarded to the winner. ESPN's broadcast began July 19th with coverage of WSOP Circuit Tournaments, and coverage of the Main Event began October 11th and ended November 15th.

All events were held at the Rio All Suite Hotel and Casino with the exception of the final 2 days of the Main Event which were held at Binion's Horseshoe. This marked the last time the Main Event final table was held at Binion's Horseshoe.

Events

Main Event
There were 5,619 entrants to the main event. Each paid $10,000 to enter what was the largest poker tournament ever played in a brick and mortar casino at the time.  Many entrants won their seat in online poker tournaments. 2004 Main Event champion Greg Raymer finished in 25th place in his title defense.

Final table

*Career statistics prior to the beginning of the 2005 Main Event.

Final table results

Other High Finishes
NB: This list is restricted to top 30 finishers with an existing Wikipedia entry.

Fall of World Champions
Day 1: Jim Bechtel, Doyle Brunson, Johnny Chan, Chris Ferguson, Phil Hellmuth, Tom McEvoy, Carlos Mortensen, Scotty Nguyen, Robert Varkonyi
Day 2: Dan Harrington, Chris Moneymaker, Huck Seed
Day 3: (none)
Day 4: Russ Hamilton
Day 5: (none)
Day 6: Greg Raymer

See also
World Series of Poker Circuit events
World Series of Poker Tournament of Champions
2005 World Series of Poker Results

References

World Series of Poker
World Series of Poker